The bombing of Alicante was an aerial attack against the Spanish city of Alicante on 25 May 1938. It was one of the deadliest aerial bombings of the Spanish Civil War.

Background
After the Aragon Offensive, Franco wanted to eliminate the Republican maritime commerce and destroy the Republican morale, so he authorized the Aviazione Legionaria and the Legion Condor to undertake indiscriminate bombings of the Republican cities. Valencia, Barcelona, Alicante, Granollers, and other Spanish town and cities were bombed.

The bombing.
On 25 May 1938, between seven and nine Italian SM.79 and SM.81 bombers of the Aviazione Legionaria bombed Alicante. The anti-aircraft artillery of the city was obsolete, and the air-alarm system of the city didn't work. The bombers dropped ninety bombs and many of them fell on the central market of the city. There were between 275 and 393 civilian deaths (100 men, 56 women, 10 children, and more than 100 unidentified bodies), and 1000 wounded. Preston said that there were several hundreds of civilians killed.

Aftermath
The bombings of Alicante and Granollers, and the attacks against British shipping provoked protests in London.

References

Explosions in 1938
Mass murder in 1938
Battles of the Spanish Civil War
1938 in Spain
Conflicts in 1938
Alicante
Spanish Civil War massacres
May 1938 events